Nils den Hartog (born 25 March 1994) is a Dutch professional footballer who last played as a goalkeeper for Kozakken Boys in the Dutch Tweede Divisie.

Career
Den Hartog played in the youth academy of RKC Waalwijk after having been scouted at his local club HSSC '61. He had initially been on a trial with PSV, but not managed to make the team. After being promoted to the first team of RKC, he was unable to play for a long time due to a fracture of his calf and shin. Den Hartog finally made his debut for the Waalwijk-based club on 19 December 2014, when they lost 5–3 to Emmen. As a replacement for Arjan van Dijk, he defended the goal throughout the game. That season he would make six appearances for the main squad and in the summer of 2015 he was assigned jersey number 1. In the summer of 2016, Den Hartog was sent on loan by RKC to Kozakken Boys for one season. After this loan period, Kozakken Boys decided to sign the goalkeeper on a permanent contract. In December 2020, it was announced that he would leave at the end of the season.

References

External links
 

1994 births
Living people
Dutch footballers
RKC Waalwijk players
Kozakken Boys players
Eerste Divisie players
Tweede Divisie players
People from Leerdam
Association football goalkeepers
Footballers from Utrecht (province)
21st-century Dutch people